Çemişgezek District is a district of Tunceli Province in Turkey. The town of Çemişgezek is its seat and the district had a population of 7,481 in 2021.

Composition 
Beside the town of Çemişgezek, the district encompasses thirty-four villages and forty-one hamlets.

Villages 

 Akçapınar
 Akçayunt
 Alakuş
 Anıl
 Arpaderen
 Aşağıbudak
 Aşağıdemirbük
 Bağsuyu
 Bozağaç
 Büyükörence
 Cebe
 Cihangir
 Dedebeyli
 Doğan
 Doğanalan
 Erkalkan
 Gedikler
 Gözlüçayır
 Gülbahçe
 Güneybaşı
 Karasar
 Kıraçlar
 Paşacık
 Payamdüzü
 Sakyol
 Sarıbalta
 Tekeli
 Toratlı
 Ulukale
 Uzungöl
 Vişneli
 Yemişdere
 Yukarıbudak
 Yünbüken

References 

Districts of Tunceli Province
Çemişgezek District